Charlene Fite (born 1950) is an American politician and a Republican member of the Arkansas State House representing District 80 since 2013.

Early life and education
Fite was born in Alma, Arkansas.  She has a B.S. in deaf education from the University of Tennessee in 2000, an M.S.Ed. in special education from the University of Arkansas, and attended the Taipei Language Institute.

Career
Fife is a retired school psychology specialist. She was first elected to the House in 2012 and has been re-elected through 2020. Her last campaign focused on economic growth; she favors less government regulation to help economic development. She is chairperson of the Aging, Children and Youth, Legislative and Military Affairs Committee; and, vice-chair of ALC-Hospital and Medicaid Subcommittee. Fite has served on the Board of Court Appointed Special Advocates in Crawford County, the Board of Children's Advocacy Centers of Arkansas, and the Board for Bost Development Centers.

Personal
She lives in Van Buren, Arkansas, and is married to Tom Fite, with six children and seven grandchildren.

References

University of Tennessee alumni
People from Alma, Arkansas
University of Arkansas alumni
Educators of the deaf
People from Van Buren, Arkansas
Living people
1950 births
21st-century American politicians
Republican Party members of the Arkansas House of Representatives